Tsutomu Miyazaki is an EP by Gnaw Their Tongues, released on March 3, 2010 by Hell Lies in Others. The album takes its name from Tsutomu Miyazaki, a Japanese serial killer who abducted and murdered four young girls. The music is thematically similar to 2007's Issei Sagawa, which was also based on a Japanese criminal.

Track listing

Personnel
Adapted from the Tsutomu Miyazaki liner notes.
 Maurice de Jong (as Mories) – vocals, instruments, recording, cover art

Release history

References

External links 
 
 Tsutomu Miyazaki at Bandcamp

2010 EPs
Gnaw Their Tongues albums